"I Got a Million of 'Em" is a song written by Ron Hellard, Michael Garvin and Bucky Jones, and recorded by American country music artist Ronnie McDowell.  It was released in June 1984 as the first single from the album Willing.  The song reached #8 on the Billboard Hot Country Singles & Tracks chart.

Chart performance

References

1984 singles
Ronnie McDowell songs
Song recordings produced by Buddy Killen
Epic Records singles
Songs written by Michael Garvin
Songs written by Bucky Jones
Songs written by Ron Hellard
1984 songs